Thomasappa Anthony Swamy is the Bishop of the Roman Catholic Diocese of Chikmagalur, India.

Early life 
He was born in Mariyanna Palya, a small  village in Bangalore on 9 February 1951.

Priesthood 
He was ordained a priest for the Archdiocese of Bangalore on 20 May 1984.

He was a professor in St. Peter's Pontifical Seminary, Bangalore. Thomasappa was in charge of Seminary Publications and Director of Kannada Sanga in St. Peter's Pontifical Seminary, Bangalore.

Education 
Bishop Anthony Swamy Thomasappa did his doctorate in Missiology in Pontifical Gregorian University in Rome.

Episcopate 
He was appointed Bishop of Chikmagalur on Dec. 2, 2006, and was ordained bishop on Feb. 6, 2007. The Karnataka state diocese belongs to the ecclesiastical province headed by the Archdiocese of Bangalore.

He worked in various parishes of the Archdiocese before being elected as the Bishop of Chikkamagaluru.

He was appointed as the Bishop of Chikkamagaluru by Pope Benedict XVI. He was installed as bishop by Bernard Blasius Moras.

References

1951 births
Living people
21st-century Roman Catholic bishops in India
Pontifical Gregorian University alumni
Bishops appointed by Pope Benedict XVI